Julie Montagu, Viscountess Hinchingbrooke (born Julie Jean Fisher; February 17, 1972) is an American entrepreneur, yoga instructor, blogger, writer and television personality. She is married to Luke Montagu, Viscount Hinchingbrooke, who is the son and heir to John Montagu, 11th Earl of Sandwich. Montagu began her television career as a cast member on the British reality series Ladies of London before hosting her own series on the Smithsonian Channel called An American Aristocrat's Guide to Great Estates. Since 2021 she has run her own series, American Viscountess, on YouTube.

Early life
Julie Fisher was born on 17 February 1972 to Thomas Fisher, and was brought up in Sugar Grove, Illinois, as one of five siblings. She went on to study computer science at Indiana University. Fisher moved to London to work for an internet-based company, and was working at a digital agency when she met Luke Montagu in 2003. She was a single mother at the time with two children, and had assumed he was not interested in her.

Three months after they began dating, the couple spent a weekend on the Isle of Wight and she noticed that his credit cards read ‘Viscount Hinchingbrooke’.  Only then did he explain that he was a member of the aristocracy and his father was John Montagu, 11th Earl of Sandwich. A year after they first met, they were married at Mapperton House, Dorset, the country estate of the Earl of Sandwich.

When Luke Montagu suffered years of side effects from being removed from prescription medication by an addiction clinic (and was later awarded £1.35 million in compensation), Julie Montagu began running yoga classes in nearby church halls in order to bring some money into the household. By that time, Luke was unable to continue in his position as  director of the Met Film School so Julie became the sole supporter. 

According to a June 2020 magazine article, Julie Montagu is a "qualified yoga teacher, nutritionist and mindfulness guru".

Career
Julie Montagu started a blog, called the "Flexi Foodie" and wrote a successful cookbook, Superfoods: The Flexible Approach to Eating More Superfoods & Superfoods Superfast. She founded the charity Council for Evidence-Based Psychiatry after Luke's recovery, based on their experiences.

She was then offered a position on the reality television series Ladies of London as her husband was recovering. She later said of the series, "We thought long and hard before accepting as it offered financial support for a while. But it was not fun to do. I was expected to behave in a way I wasn't, like an It girl or socialite, when I'm not. They edit you... You have to go along with things or you get fired. But you know it was a job. I was acting". She celebrated when it was cancelled after three seasons. In 2016, the couple took over the running of the Mapperton Estate. By that time, Far from the Madding Crowd had recorded some scenes at the estate.

The series brought financial stability which allowed the couple to invest further in the Mapperton Estate, turning an old stable block into a wedding venue. Julie also opened her own school of yoga on the grounds, but continues to practice yoga elsewhere, headlining an act at the Wanderlust yoga festival in Victoria Park, London. During the lead-up to the wedding of Prince Harry and Meghan Markle, Julie Montagu was interviewed on a number of occasions because she is a US citizen who married into British aristocracy; she was also an on-site commentator on the wedding for the BBC. She was also interviewed following such events as Markle's father selling a private letter his daughter had sent him, and the royal couple's break from the monarchy in 2020.

In a 2017 interview, the couple were working to increase the business: "by attracting more visitors and more weddings. At the moment we host 12 a year but we are hoping to build that up to 40". The cost of operating the Mapperton estate was £200,000 per annum at that time. Because of the restrictions due to the COVID-19 pandemic, Luke estimated that they lost £200,000 that year.

After appearing on their "Million Dollar American Princess" documentary series, she was asked by the Smithsonian Channel to host a new series to air in 2020, An American Aristocrat's Guide to Great Estates, which was also streaming on Amazon Prime Video in North America by March 2021.

On 17 October 2021, Julie appeared on CNN’s documentary series, Diana.

Personal life
She is married to Luke Montagu, Viscount Hinchingbrooke, and has four children, two of whom are from her first marriage and two with Luke. She supported her husband through his recovery from a dependency of prescription drugs and now campaigns for greater awareness of the issue.

In 2021, she enrolled at the University of Buckingham to work towards a Master's of Arts in Country House Studies.

References

External links
 Julie Montagu at the Smithsonian Channel

Living people
People from Sugar Grove, Illinois
People from Dorset
Founders of charities
20th-century American businesspeople
21st-century American businesspeople
20th-century American women
Participants in British reality television series
Julie
American yoga teachers
Indiana University alumni
American cookbook writers
21st-century American women writers
American emigrants to England
American women non-fiction writers
1972 births
21st-century American non-fiction writers
Educators from Illinois
American women educators
Hitchingbrooke
American expatriates in England